Koyul is a village in the Leh district of Ladakh, India. It is located in the Nyoma tehsil, on the banks of the Koyul Lungpa river just before it joins the Indus River.

Geography 
The village of Koyul is in the Koyul Lungpa valley, which houses an active river that joins the Indus near Fukche. The river originates at the twin passes Zulung La and Dilung La on Ladakh's border with Tibet's Zanda County and flows northeast. Koyul is about 8 km away from the junction with the Indus.

Between the Koyul Lungpa and the Indus valley to the east is a ridge, which also goes by the name "Koyul ridge". China's claim line of the Demchok sector runs along the crest of this ridge.
The Koyul village is just beyond the claim line (in undisputed territory), but the claim line cuts the Koyul ridge in half and partially blocks Koyul's access to the Indus valley.

Demographics 
According to the 2011 census of India, Koyul has 115 households. The effective literacy rate (i.e. the literacy rate of population excluding children aged 6 and below) is 64.76%.

References

Bibliography 
 Romesh Bhattacharji, Mesmerised in Ladakh, Frontline, 15 January 2011.

External links 

Villages in Nyoma tehsil